Deoksan Hwang clan is one of the Korean clans. Their Bon-gwan is in Yesan County, South Chungcheong Province. According to the research held in 2015, the number of Deoksan Hwang clan’s member was 3857. Hwang Rak, a minister in Han dynasty, began Hwang clan in Korea. Hwang Rak had an accident on the sea on his way to Vietnam as an envoy in 28 during Emperor Guangwu of Han’s reign. Then, Hwang Rak drifted ashore in Silla and was naturalized there.

See also 
 Korean clan names of foreign origin

References

External links 
 

 
Hwang clans
Korean clan names of Chinese origin